Richard Edvardsen (born 17 November 1936) is a Norwegian politician for the Socialist Left Party.

He served as a deputy representative to the Norwegian Parliament from Troms during the term 1993–1997.

He is a former member of the Norwegian Consumer Council.

References

1936 births
Living people
Socialist Left Party (Norway) politicians
Deputy members of the Storting
Troms politicians
Place of birth missing (living people)
20th-century Norwegian politicians